Ludmila Andreyevna Kuprianova (1914-1987) was a Soviet palynologist and Chairman of the Palynological Section of the All-Union Botanical Society (USSR). Her scientific career spanned more than 50 years, most of it associated with the Komarov Botanical Institute in Leningrad. She was among the first to recognize the importance of vouchered pollen and spore reference collections for research.

References

Palynos 11(1): p. 5, 1988.

External links
St.-Petersburg, Russia, Komarov Botanical Institute of Russian Academy of Sciences

1914 births
1987 deaths
Russian women botanists
Soviet botanists
Soviet women scientists
Herzen University alumni